Félix M. Méndez is the founder and president of eContent TV (formerly eContenido), a production company dedicated to providing exclusive content for television, film, Internet and mobile technologies for distribution worldwide. Méndez is an international award winning producer and director with more than 19 years experience in the industry.

As a wine and food enthusiast, Méndez has found a way to combine his passion and his profession by creating and producing shows about gastrotourism in the US and Europe.

His advertising work includes the production of commercials in the US and Mexico for such clients as Procter and Gamble, Chrysler, K-Mart, L’Oreal, Redken, Jumex Nectars, and Bonafont water for which he won Mexico’s Circulo de Oro, and the Fiap award for best 3D animation. He has also produced music videos for several artists such as Plácido Domingo's medley "La Flor de la Canela" for worldwide release on the EMI label.

He established the bureau and was the New York producer for Univision Network’s Sabado Gigante and Noche de Gigantes for over 5 years. These TV shows were broadcast in the US and in 18 countries in Latin America, reaching an audience of over 20 million people.

Other experience includes CNBC's Conexión Financiera, and The World Wrestling Federation's "Los Superastros," the highest rated show for its time slot on the Univision Network.

Méndez developed strategic content alliances with The Wall Street Journal Interactivo, Agencia EFE, World Wrestling Federation, and others. During his experience in Mexico he served as principal of Pixel Light Mexico, a 3-D animation, graphic design, and special effects company.

He worked as a media advisor to Grupo Asesor Mexico, a consulting firm promoting international business and ArteMusa Productions Mexico.

He holds a Master of Arts degree from New York University and a B.A. from the University of Puerto Rico. He is also an accomplished jazz composer.

References

External links

Living people
Year of birth missing (living people)
New York University alumni
University of Puerto Rico alumni